The 1951 Hoffmann is a three-wheeled car created by Michael Hoffmann, a shop foreman from Munich.  

Only one Hoffmann was ever made; it is currently part of the collection at the Lane Motor Museum in Nashville, Tennessee, USA.

Design

The car is notable for its plethora of unconventional and often user-hostile design elements. These include:

Windows that are raised or lowered with a strap that the user pulls, and held in place with eyelets and pegs
Suicide doors and a driving position that make ingress and egress extremely difficult
A starter awkwardly placed by the driver's right hip
A fuel filler tube which goes from the roof, directly through the cabin of the car
Front wheels that are farther apart than the length of the wheelbase
A linear rather than H-shaped shift pattern with a neutral between each gear
The rear wheel is placed immediately behind the driver, with a large portion of the car behind it
Rear-wheel steering
The combination of the previous two features mean that the car has an extremely high tendency to slew.
An engine located on the same pivot as the rear wheel steering mechanism, so that the engine moves with the wheel when the car is steered
Rearview mirrors positioned so that they are perfectly blocked by the A-pillar
Two-stroke engine, which requires engine oil to be continuously mixed into the fuel supply
Single-cylinder engine, which causes greater vibration than multi-cylinder engines
Rear-mounted engine that is dependent on air cooling, but the lack of a fan causes overheating when idling

References

External links
A Jalopnik article on the car

Cars introduced in 1951
Cars of Germany